The Naked and the Dead is a World War II novel by Norman Mailer.

The Naked and the Dead may also refer to:
The Naked and the Dead (film), a 1958 film adaptation of the book, starring Aldo Ray and Cliff Robertson
"The Naked and the Dead, but Mostly the Naked", a Married… with Children episode